Application site reactions are reactions to medical treatments which occur at the site of application. An example is skin reactions to transdermal patches.

See also
 Injection site reaction
 Skin lesion
 List of cutaneous conditions

References

Drug eruptions